The Holy Rosary Cathedral (officially called ) is the oldest Catholic church in Taiwan, located in Lingya District, Kaohsiung, just east of the Love River. It is the seat of the Bishop of Kaohsiung.

History
The cathedral was first established in 1860 by Spanish from Filipinas and rebuilt to its present dimensions in 1928.

Architecture
The architectural style is modeled after both Gothic and Romanesque. The interior design is loosely similar to that of Manila Cathedral in the Philippines.

Activities
Mass is held daily, with English mass celebrated at 11:00 a.m. every Sunday. The cathedral is known throughout Kaohsiung for its annual Christmas Eve celebrations, which lasts the whole evening before Christmas Day.

Transportation
The cathedral is accessible within walking distance west from Central Park Station of Kaohsiung MRT.

See also
 Catholic Church in Taiwan
 Christianity in Taiwan
 Roman Catholic Diocese of Kaohsiung

External links

 Holy Rosary Cathedral website (Traditional Chinese)

1860 establishments in Taiwan
Basilica churches in Taiwan
Lingya District
Religious buildings and structures in Kaohsiung
Kaohsiung Cathedral
Kaohsiung Cathedral
20th-century Roman Catholic church buildings